Newbold Verdon is a village and civil parish in the county of Leicestershire, England. The parish includes Newbold Heath to the north and Brascote to the south. Originally an agricultural centre Newbold Verdon grew in size during the 1850s with the expansion of coal mining in the area. That industry has now ceased leaving Newbold Verdon as a commuter village primarily serving Leicester (9 .5 miles east) and Hinckley (8.5 miles south). The 2001 census recorded a population of 3,193, which had reduced to 3,012 at the 2011 census.

Etymology
The Domesday Book (1086) records the settlement as Niwebold meaning 'New Build'. It acquired the suffix Verdon from Nicholas de Verdon who owned the manor in 1226. While the civil parish is Newbold Verdon the ecclesiastical parish retains the form Newbold de Verdun. Nicholas's descendant William de Ferrers was born in Newbold in 1332 or 1333.

History
In the itinerary of 1280, Newbold, Brascote, Naneby and Barlestone answered collectively as one village, which contained 80 acres of woodland and a vineyard.

The manor was held in 1401 by Walter Devereux and was later divided through marriage into four parts, with one of these parts going to Henry de Ferrars.

In the year of 1428 the village was quarantined due to an outbreak of cholera, however this was short-lived as the quarantine was lifted soon after the outbreak was found to be non-serious.

In 1625, Sir Thomas Crewe purchased land in Newbold which was eventually passed down to Nathaniel, who was then Lord Crewe, Bishop of Durham.

A part of Newbold was enclosed in 1509, although the main enclosure took place in 1810 when the church was awarded 1,316 acres of glebe land.

Six cottages were built in 1794 for the poor of the parish, with benefaction money and they were also allocated the use of 10 acres of land at the time of the enclosure.

Cob Cottage is probably the oldest remaining home which dates back to 1650.

On Sunday 22 March 2015, the funeral cortège of King Richard III passed through Market Bosworth, Newbold Verdon and Desford en-route to his interment in Leicester Cathedral.

Industry 
Framework knitters were operating in the village in 1812, and by 1845 over 60 frames were in existence.

By then, coal was being mined in the neighbouring villages and many abandoned their frames and drifted into the mines.

Like many other villages Newbold was almost self supporting having its own tailors, blacksmith and wheelwright, butchers and shoemakers.

It was no problem for the bakers to obtain flour as three windmills operated in the village.

Besides the mill in Mill Lane, a windmill was obtained from Syston in 1812 and was erected on a site near to what is now the Windmill Inn, there was a third mill in Desford Road.

Education
The local primary school is in Dragon Lane. The school has one class per cohort and an Autism specific Unit. It has a sensory garden, pond and forest school.

Churches
 St. James's Church (1209)
 A Methodist chapel (1894)
 A Baptist church (1833)

The Bright Hour at the Baptist Church has been running for many years along with the more recently started Grandtots Group.

Public houses
There are two public houses: the Jubilee and the Windmill (which is in Brascote) plus a working men's club.

Sport
A short-lived greyhound racing track existed in the village, which started racing on 15 April 1930. The racing was independent (not affiliated to the sports governing body the National Greyhound Racing Club) and was known as a flapping track, which was the nickname given to independent tracks. The exact location of the track is presently unknown.

References

External links

 
Village website
Newbold Verdon Parish
Newbold Verdon library
St. James Church Hall
Newbold Verdon Baptist Church Bright Hour
The Churches of Newbold Verdon

Villages in Leicestershire
Civil parishes in Leicestershire
Hinckley and Bosworth